Saudi Arabia participated at the 2018 Summer Youth Olympics in Buenos Aires, Argentina from 6 October to 18 October 2018.

Competitors

Athletics

Fencing

Saudi Arabia was given a quota to compete by the tripartite committee.

 Boys' Sabre - 1 quota

Karate

Saudi Arabia qualified one athlete based on its performance at one of the Karate Qualification Tournaments.

 Boys' -61 kg - Mohammad Al-Assiri

Swimming

Taekwondo

Weightlifting

Saudi Arabia qualified one athlete based on its performance at the 2018 Asian Youth Championships.

References

2018 in Saudi Arabian sport
Nations at the 2018 Summer Youth Olympics
Saudi Arabia at the Youth Olympics